Margareth Menezes da Purificação (born 13 October 1962) is a Brazilian singer and politician from Salvador, Bahia.

Her style is considered axé but her music also steers into samba and MPB territory, at times drawing on African rhythms and reggae.

Menezes is best known in Brazil for her song "Me Abraça e Me Beija", a major hit in 1990. She also scored another hit with "Dandalunda", a song which became the unofficial anthem of the 2003 Salvador carnival.

Menezes has achieved superstardom in her native Bahia but only moderate success in wider Brazil. She is famed for her energetic live performances and regularly tours and performs at carnival celebrations.

In 1990, one of Menezes's tracks "Elegibô (Uma Historia De Ifa)" was used in the Mickey Rourke film Wild Orchid. This prompted Island Records in the US to release a compilation album of some of her older material from Brazil on their subsidiary label, Mango. The album, simply titled Elegibô, was an instant hit, reaching # 1 on the Billboard World Music chart at a time when David Byrne was championing Brazilian music in the US. The title track itself became a regular staple at clubs playing so-called world music throughout the US and Europe. The album also received a full release in the UK, Germany and France. A single, "Tenda do Amor", was also released from the album in some European territories. Menezes toured internationally on the back of this album, generating a lot of press in the process. A second US-released follow-up album Kindala, released late 1991, but repackaged in some territories from the Brazilian version of the same name, also achieved some success. This release also gave Menezes a minor hit album in France too.

In 2001, Menezes released the highly acclaimed Afropopbrasileiro (also known as "Maga") showcasing her trademark fusion of afro-Brazilian beats. The album was produced by Carlinhos Brown of Tribalistas fame and was well received in Brazil and internationally.

Menezes also co-wrote and performed on the 2003 Tribalistas hit "Passe Em Casa", from the million-selling Tribalistas album.

Her 2005 single, "Como Tu", a duet with Brazilian superstar Ivete Sangalo was released amidst much hype because Sangalo was achieving platinum album sales at the time. The track reached the lower reaches of the airplay Top 30 in Brazil but failed to emulate the success of recent Sangalo hits. The hit single was lifted from Menezes' 2005 album release Pra Você; the album received lukewarm reviews, possibly owing to a more poppier sound than previous releases. A second single, the reggae-tinged "Miragem na esquina" performed poorly at radio.

In 2006, the album Pra Você received a Grammy nomination for "Best Brazilian Contemporary Pop Album".

More recently, Menezes participated on the track "Beijo Descarado" by Timbalada which achieved some airplay success in Brazil during the 2007 Carnival celebrations.

In 2010, an acoustic version of her 2008 album Naturalmente was released. The album was recorded at Ilha dos Sapos and featured guests like Gilberto Gil, Carlinhos Brown and Portuguese singer Luis Represas.

Menezes remains one of the most dynamic and popular of the contemporary Brazilian artists achieving international recognition.

She became Brazil's Minister of Culture on 1 January 2023.

Discography 

Studio albums
 1988: Margareth Menezes
 1989: Um Canto Pra Subir
 1991: Kindala (#2 at Billboard Top World Albums)
 1993: Luz Dourada
 1995: Gente de Festa
 2001: Afropopbrasileiro
 2005: Pra Você
 2008: Naturalmente

Compilation
 1989: Elegibô (#1 at Billboard Top World Albums)

Live albums
 2003: Tete A Tete Margareth
 2004: Festival de Verão de Salvador
 2007: Brasileira Ao Vivo: Uma Homenagem Ao Samba-Reggae
 2010: Naturalmente Acústico

Other Albums
 1998: Disco Autoral

External links

1962 births
Living people
20th-century Brazilian women singers
20th-century Brazilian singers
People from Salvador, Bahia
Brazilian Candomblés
Afro-Brazilian women singers
21st-century Brazilian women singers
21st-century Brazilian singers
Ministers of Culture of Brazil
Women government ministers of Brazil